El Mahmoudia is an Egyptian city on the connection point between the Nile and Mahmoudiyah canal. It's a city with a history despite its modernity. It was one of the most important trade ports on the Nile River. Trading ships traveling from Upper Egypt and Lower Egypt to Alexandria passed through its lock and up the Mahmoudiyah Canal. Also trading ships from Alexandria carried imported merchandises to Cairo passing by it.

Special location 
The city's special location made it a major trade center in the region. As ships stopped in its natural mooring in the Nile the city had a major activity in markets.

History 

Mahmoudiyah was built over Al-Atf village, which was called Balhib in Middle Ages, and it was a police station belonging to the Rashid Center. It is distinguished by its great mosque that was built during the reign of Muhammad Ali. And it was named after Mahmoudiyah after the name of Sultan Mahmoud Khan in Istanbul. Egypt was a vassal of the Ottoman Empire, at which time Muhammad Ali Pasha was the governor in Egypt.

Its name is associated with the name of a nearby canal, and the city is characterized by a hydraulic system of locks, whose waters patch the boats from the Nile and lower them from the canal to the level of the Nile. The city was surrounded by water, especially in the south. It was branching from the Mahmudiyah Canal, the Rashidiyya Canal, which used to supply Rashid and Idku with water for drinking and irrigation.

Modern 

The city of Mahmoudiya was occupied by garrisons, like other strategic cities during the First World War. The British garrison consisted of Indian, Irish, African and English soldiers. The city was a strategic site and target for the Germans in World War II.

Because the city is located at the mouth of the Mahmoudiyah Canal, which was a waterway to transport goods and the British weaponry from Alexandria to Cairo to enter boats to the Nile.

In December 1916, the people were celebrating the wedding of a native couple, and they were marching in a procession, carrying lamps and torches, and they were shouting. The garrison's leader thought it was a rebellion so he ordered the garrison to attack the residents. Fighting between the locals and the garrison took place, which prompted the garrison commander to ask the town’s leaders to negotiate with them. The mayor of the city, Darwish al-Wailili, headed a delegation and met with the garrison commander and asked him to apologize to the people for this attack.

In the 1919 revolution, the people of Mahmudiya smashed the Delta Railroad tracks and set the main station on fire.

On July 11, 1942 and during World War II, Mahmoudiyah  received thousands of displaced people who were spared the horrors of bombing and bombs from Alexandria, Kafr el-Dawar, Khorshid, and al-Baida. It was providing them with shelter and food, even though in World War II, the Al-Atf power station was used to generate electricity for Lower Egypt and the Ahmouda Canal canal, which connects drinking water to Alexandria, Abu Homs, and Kafr al-Dawwar, were strategic targets of Hitler's planes.

Geography 

River and sea-going craft along this coast were sometimes exposed to rough water. As a result boats were often crowded along the canal opening by the intensity of the commercial traffic on the coast by the island of Ful Al-Madina. The city therefore promoted commercial and navigational agencies to govern water traffic especially during the First and Second World Wars.

Mahmoudiyah Center was famous for the cultivation of rice and cotton transported through the Mahmoudiyah Canal to be exported to Europe. This city was one of the major commercial cities in Lower Egypt for its unique geographical location. The Nile to its north was as wide as a natural harbor, and to its east is the mouth of the Mahmoudiyah Canal. In addition, there is a pump station to raise the Nile water to the canal that supplies several cities in the West Delta, including Alexandria.

Climate 
Köppen-Geiger climate classification system classifies its climate as hot desert (BWh), but due to its closeness to the northern coast of Egypt, its temperatures are moderated by the prevailing winds of the Mediterranean Sea.

Notable people
Hassan al-Banna

See also
 Mahmoudiyah canal

References 

Populated places in Beheira Governorate
Populated places on the Nile
Port cities and towns in Egypt